The Lord of the Rings: The Battle for Middle-earth II: The Rise of the Witch-king is a real-time strategy video game published by Electronic Arts, based on the Lord of the Rings film series based on the book, directed by Peter Jackson. The Rise of the Witch-king is the expansion to The Lord of the Rings: The Battle for Middle-earth II, which was published by the same company and released in 2006, for Microsoft Windows. The Rise of the Witch-king was released on November 30, 2006.

The campaign allows the player to command the army of Angmar from its foundation and early attacks against Arnor, to the destruction of Arnor at the battle of Fornost. An epilogue mission allows the player to command the forces of Gondor and the Elves as they invade Angmar in retaliation for destroying Arnor. The story for The Rise of the Witch-king draws a great deal upon the Appendices at the end of the Return of the King to form a basis for the conflict between Arnor and Angmar. Many of the notes that Tolkien made regarding the war are used as missions in the games campaign and epilogue. Although the game closely follows Tolkien's writing, some events are modified to suit the gameplay (such as the palantír of Amon Sûl being destroyed rather than brought to safety at Fornost), or are omitted altogether (such as the flight of King Arvedui from the defeat at Fornost).

Gameplay changes
The game features a new faction, Angmar, bringing the total number of playable factions to seven. It also comes with a new campaign based on Angmar, consisting of eight missions telling the rise of the Witch-king of Angmar and the fall of the kingdom of Arnor. New units were added to all six existing factions, as well as both new and improved buildings and heroes. Every faction except Angmar also received an elite hero unit. Elite hero units have a small amount of health and deal a large amount of damage, but there are a small number of them in each battalion, and they only replenish their numbers at a healing structure. Major improvements were made to the War of the Ring mode, including army persistence from RTS mode to the World Map, the introduction of an economy to the World Map, and the introduction of siege weapons to the World Map. Fourteen new territories and battle maps were added, as well as a new region, the Forodwaith. Four hero armies were also made available per faction. The Rise of the Witch-king also added two new historical scenarios for the War of the Ring mode, including the Fall of Arnor and the War of the Ring. Create-A-Hero mode added two extra troll races, new weapons, and armor customization. Heroes were given a cost system tied to the number of powers given to them. Due to a license expiration, EA has shut down the online server as of January 2011. Today the community has moved to a new server through the downloadable program 'Game Ranger' where previous EA and new players continue to host & play on the official EA 2.01 patch.

Plot

Reception

The game received favorable reviews from critics. On the review aggregator GameRankings, the game had an average score of 78% based on 22 reviews. On Metacritic, the game had an average score of 78 out of 100 based on 22 reviews. NZGamer gave the expansion an 8.0 out of 10, crediting the games improvement of many aspects over the original Battle for Middle-earth, as well as the games campaign for its use of a lesser known part of Middle-earth's history.

References

External links
 EA's official add-on site

Lord of the Rings, The: The Battle for Middle-earth 2 - The Rise of the Witch-king
Electronic Arts games
Lord of the Rings, The: The Battle for Middle-earth 2 - The Rise of the Witch-king
Lord of the Rings, The: The Battle for Middle-earth 2 - The Rise of the Witch-king
Lord of the Rings, The: The Battle for Middle-earth 2 - The Rise of the Witch-king
Windows-only games
Battle for Middle-earth II - The Rise of the Witch-king
Video games based on adaptations
Video games based on films
SAGE (game engine) games
Multiplayer and single-player video games
Video games developed in the United States